Aafjes is a relatively rare Dutch surname. It is probably matronymic ("child of Aafje") and may have originated in the Zaanstreek. Aafjes may refer to:

 Bertus Aafjes (1914–1993), Dutch poet
 Gerard Aafjes (born 1985), Dutch football defender

References

Dutch-language surnames
Matronymic surnames